Shakthisree Gopalan (born 25 October 1987) is an Indian vocalist, songwriter and performer, famous for her collaborations with the top south-Indian music composers like A.R. Rahman. Aside from the film music, she is a regular in the independent music scene, performing with various bands over the years dabbling in Pop,  R'n'B, trip-hop and jazz.

She has also been performing and releasing music independently in multiple languages.
She is an architect by profession, graduating from School of Architecture and Planning.

Early life
Shakthisree Gopalan was born and brought up in Kochi, Kerala. She did her schooling in Rajagiri Public School, Kalamassery. She moved to Chennai after her school and pursued her degree in architecture at the Anna University's School of Architecture and Planning.

She was trained in Carnatic music for 13 years. During her 11th standard, SS Music conducted Voice Hunt 1. Since she was under 18, it ended with the auditions. Eventually in 2008, she won the second season of SS Music's Voice Hunt. She was first auditioned in November 2008 and got the opportunity to sing her debut song for the film Taxi 4777.

Career
At the age of 13, Shakthisree Gopalan was already trained in the field of Carnatic music and rock. After having won the "SS Music Voice Hunt " title in the year 2008, Gopalan debuted into film playback in the same year. She was placed third in the Chennai Live's Band hunt. In the year 2014, she performed in MCC (Madras Christian College) cultural fest at Deepwoods and National Institute of Technology, Tiruchirappalli cultural fest Festember, SASTRA University cultural fest Kuruksastra'14, VIT University cultural fest Riviera 14 and Madras Institute of Technology cultural fest Mitafest 15.

"Off the Record" consists of Vikram Vivekanand (Guitar), Satish Narayanan (Bass) and Tapas Naresh/Vinay Ramakrishnan (Drums).

Break 
Shaktisree met A R Rahman when she got an assignment to design his music school, K M Music Conservatory. It was around that time she shared the music she had composed with him. That's when she got a break to sing 'Nenjikulle' for the movie Kadal, the first song that she recorded in her career. However, the title track for the composer's Bollywood film, Jab Tak Hai Jaan (2012) released first. She also got to jam the unplugged version of her Tamil film song "Nenjukkule" from the film Kadal with A R Rahman.

She subsequently went on to record a number of  songs for films such as "Irumbukottai Murattu Singham", "Kattradhu Kalavu". She has also been a backlisted vocalist for many A R Rahman compositions.

Apart from playback singing for movies, she also collaborated with Prashanth and released an indie single called Begin in November 2017.

She also released  ‘By Your Side’ in December 2016, in which she collaborated with Hari Dafusia, a Toronto-based keyboardist-producer, and Nigel Roopnarine, a bass player.

Awards 
She has won the Filmfare Award for Best Female Playback Singer – Tamil and the Vijay Award for Best Female Playback Singer for  singing "Nenjukkulle"  from Kadal.

Discography

Filmography

As a dubbing artist

Television
Vani Rani - 2013
 Singing Stars of Colors Tamil- Judge
 Top Singer of Flowers Malayalam- Judge

Awards and nominations
Won - Filmfare Award for Best Female Playback Singer – Tamil - "Nenjukkulle" - Kadal
Won - Vijay Award for Best Female Playback Singer - "Nenjukkulle" - Kadal
Nominated - Filmfare Award for Best Female Playback Singer – Tamil - "Naan Nee" - Madras
Nominated - Vijay Award for Best Female Playback Singer - "Naan Nee" - Madras
Nominated - SIIMA Award for Best Female Playback Singer – Tamil  - "Bhoomi Bhoomi" - Chekka Chivantha Vaanam
Nominated-Filmfare Award for Best Female Playback Singer - Tamil -  Bhoomi Bhoomi-Chekka Chivantha Vaanam

References

External links

Living people
Indian women pop singers
21st-century Indian singers
Indian women playback singers
Tamil playback singers
Bollywood playback singers
Indian women songwriters
Musicians from Kochi
Film musicians from Kerala
Indian women jazz singers
Indian jazz singers
Indian guitarists
21st-century guitarists
1988 births
Filmfare Awards South winners
21st-century Indian women singers
Women musicians from Kerala
21st-century women guitarists